The sixth and final season of 3rd Rock from the Sun, an American television series, began October 24, 2000, and ended on May 22, 2001. It aired on NBC. The region 1 DVD was released on November 14, 2006.

Cast and characters

Main cast 
 John Lithgow as Dick Solomon
 Kristen Johnston as Sally Solomon
 French Stewart as Harry Solomon
 Joseph Gordon-Levitt as Tommy Solomon
 Jane Curtin as Dr. Mary Albright
 Simbi Khali as Nina Campbell
 Elmarie Wendel as Mrs. Mamie Dubcek
 Wayne Knight as Officer Don Leslie Orville

Recurring cast 
 David DeLuise as Bug Pollone
 Ian Lithgow as Leon
 Danielle Nicolet as Caryn
 Chris Hogan as Aubrey Pitman
 Ileen Getz as Dr. Judith Draper
 Jan Hooks as Vicki Dubcek
 Ron West as Dr. Vincent Strudwick
 Larisa Oleynik as Alissa Strudwick
 John Cleese as Dr. Liam Neesam

Episodes

References

External links 
 
 

6
2000 American television seasons
2001 American television seasons